Mike Clendenen was a dominant, barefoot placekicker for the Houston Cougars from 1981 to 1984. He was the first place kicking specialist to ever be put on athletic scholarship in the UH football program.

Clendenen auditioned for the kicking job at La Porte High School . Just as the head coach walked onto the field for the tryout, Clendenen knocked through a 55-yarder. "I'll see you out here Monday," the coach said.

References 

1963 births
Living people
American football placekickers
Houston Cougars football players
Houston Oilers players
Denver Broncos players
National Football League replacement players